Marcel Granollers and Horacio Zeballos defeated Tim Pütz and Michael Venus in the final, 6–4, 6–7(5–7), [14–12] to win the doubles tennis title at the 2022 Halle Open. The pair saved two championship points en route to the title.

Kevin Krawietz and Horia Tecău were the defending champions, but Tecău retired from professional tennis at the end of 2021. Krawietz played alongside Andreas Mies but lost in the quarterfinals to Pütz and Venus.

Seeds

Draw

Draw

Qualifying

Seeds

Qualifiers
  Ariel Behar /  Gonzalo Escobar (withdrew)

Lucky losers

Qualifying draw

References

External links
 Main draw
 Qualifying draw

Halle Open - Doubles
Doubles